Serious Men is an Indian Hindi-language satirical comedy-drama film directed by Sudhir Mishra. The film is based on the book of the same name by Manu Joseph and features Nawazuddin Siddiqui  in the lead role. The film is produced by Bombay Fables and Cineraas Entertainment. It was released on Netflix on 2 October 2020.

Plot
The story follows Ayyan Mani, a middle-aged man working as an assistant to an astronomer at the National Institute of Fundamental Research in Mumbai. He lives in a slum with his wife and son. Furious at his situation in life, Ayyan develops an outrageous story that his 10-year-old son is a science genius—a lie which later gets out of control.

Cast
 Nawazuddin Siddiqui as Ayyan Mani
 Indira Tiwari as Oja Mani
 Aakshath Das as Adi Mani
 Nassar as Dr. Arvind Acharya
 Sanjay Narvekar as Keshav Dhavre
 Shweta Basu Prasad as Anuja Dhavre
 Vidhi Chitalia as Oparna
 Pathy Aiyar as Udayan
 Sameer Khakhar as Ganesh Tawde
 Uday Mahesh as Dr. Namboodri
 Manu Joseph as Journalist at press conference

Production
The film is based on the book Serious Men by Manu Joseph. The makers of the film decided to cast Nawazuddin Siddiqui as the lead in June 2019. Principal photography commenced in September 2019.

Release
The film was released on Netflix on 2 October 2020.

Accolades

References

External links
 
 

2020 films
Films based on books
Films based on Indian novels
Hindi-language Netflix original films
Films about the caste system in India